Thoralf “Thor” Mauritz Sundt, III is an American cardiac surgeon who was the 97th president of the American Association for Thoracic Surgery (AATS), succeeding Joseph S. Coselli and preceding Duke Cameron.

Sundt is the chief of cardiac surgery at Massachusetts General Hospital and director of their Corrigan Minehan Heart Center.  He is also the Edward D. Churchill Professor of Surgery at Harvard Medical School.

Biography
Sundt was born on October 14, 1957 in Memphis, Tennessee. When he was 12, he and his family moved to Rochester, Minnesota, when his father became chief of neurosurgery at the Mayo Clinic.  He went to Princeton University for his undergraduate degree in biochemistry.

He received his medical degree from Johns Hopkins School of Medicine.

References

American cardiac surgeons
Living people
20th-century American physicians
21st-century American physicians
Physicians of Massachusetts General Hospital
Johns Hopkins School of Medicine alumni
1957 births
Princeton University alumni